Mirgor is an Argentinean company that produces electronics, mobile and automotive components, and exports agricultural products. The company's administrativea headquarters are located in the city of Buenos Aires,.  while its factory is in Río Grande, Tierra de Fuego. electronics and automotive components, and exports, distributes and commercializes agricultural products. The company's administrative headquarters are located in the city of Buenos Aires, while its factories are in Río Grande, Tierra de Fuego.

History 
The company began by producing car air-conditioning systems in the city of Río Grande in Argentina. In 2004, the company began production of home air-conditioning systems, then in 2006 it began clumping activities in the city of Rosario in Argentina.

In 2009, Mirgor purchased Industria Austral de Tecnología S.A. (IATEC), which produced mobile phones for Nokia in 2010 and televisions for LG in 2011. Production of audio equipment, video equipment, and microwaves began in 2012, followed by Dell notebooks a year later.

IATEC began assembly of mobile phones and televisions for Samsung in 2014, along with automotive electronics products for Pioneer. In 2017, a subsidiary called GMRA was formed, for the branding of consumer electronic and electric products. Also in 2017, the company received IATF 16949 and ISO 9001 certification.

In 2019, Mirgor acquired Holdcar, a holding corporation for Famar and Electrotécnica. The former produces mobile phones and consumer-grade modems, which Electrotécnic produces car radios, hardware and software systems, alarms and electronic control modules.

In October, 2020 Mirgor acquired the Argentinean subsidiary of wireless communications company Brightstar Corporation.

Products and services 
In 2019, Mirgor began exporting wheat, soybeans and corn. Also in 2019, the company opened a logistics center located in Garín, Argentina.

The company produced wheel assembly, infotainment and air conditioning systems for car manufacturers Toyota, Fiat and Volvo in 2020. In 2006, the company produced air-conditioning systems for car manufacturers Peugeot and Citroën. In 2020, the company produced smartphones for Samsung.

The Grupo Mirgor Retail Argentina subsidiary operates the Samsung stores in Argentina, along running with the marketing of Samsung phones in the country. The company has developed Samsung’s own marketplace in Argentina called Diggit.

References

Manufacturing companies established in 1971
Argentine companies established in 1971
Home appliance manufacturers of Argentina
Heating, ventilation, and air conditioning companies
Mobile phone manufacturers
Argentine brands
Companies listed on the Buenos Aires Stock Exchange
Companies listed on the London Stock Exchange
Companies based in Buenos Aires